Ihor Kaczurowskyj (in Ukrainian: Ігор Васильович Качуровський; 1 September 1918, in Nizhyn, Ukraine – 18 July 2013, in Munich, Germany) was a Ukrainian poet, translator, novelist and short story writer, literary scholar, university lecturer, journalist.

Life 

Ihor Kaczurowskyj was born on 1 September 1918 in Nizhyn (Ukraine) in a family of graduated of the Kyiv University. His father practised law, afterwards specialized in economy as well, for some time the held the rank of a state secretary assistant in the Central Council of Ukraine (Ukrainian: Центральна Рада).

Until the age of 12, Kaczurowskyj lived in Kruty, a small village (presently in the Nizhyn district of the Chernihiv Oblast). In 1932 the family, in order to avoid repressions, set off for Kursk (Russia). Kaczurowskyj studied, till 1941, in the Kursk "pedagogical institute" (an establishment of higher education in the Soviet Union), where Boris Jarkho (Jarcho), Petro Odarchenko were professors; in 1942 he returned to Ukraine, in 1943 he moved westward; from 1945 on he lived in Austria.

Kaczurowskyj started to publish his writings in 1946, winning the next year a literary prize for his short story “The Passport”; at the same time he began to co-operate with the staff of the magazine “Litavry” (“Kettle-drums”). He was one of the founding members of the Union of Ukrainian Scholars, Writers and Artists in Salzburg.  In 1948 he emigrated to Argentina and settled near Buenos Aires. Working as a port labourer, he at the same time edited the magazine “Porohy”  (“Dnipro-Waterfalls”), wrote for the periodicals “Ovyd” (“Outlook”), “Mitla” (“The Broom”), “Novi Dni” (“New Days”). In 1958–62 he assisted the Instituto Grafotécnico (a Literary Institution); 1963–64 he lectured on Ancient Ukrainian literature at the Catholic University, in 1968 on Russian literature at the University of El Salvador, both in Buenos Aires.  In 1969 he moved to Munich (German Federal Republic), remaining nevertheless a citizen of Argentina. In the 1970–80s he wrote and broadcast over two-thousand scripts, as a literary commentator (program specialist) at the “Ukrainian Desk” of the broadcasting service Radio Free Europe/Radio Liberty. At the Ukrainian Free University (Munich), he obtained his PhD degree for his thesis “Old Slavic beliefs and their connections with Indo-Iranian religions”; from 1973 on he lectured at the UFU, from 1982 as an ordinary professor; at the Faculty of Philosophy he held lectures on Metre (poetry)versification, stylistics, theory of literary genres, history of the Ukrainian literature of the 1920–30s, History of Medieval European literature. He was a member of the Association of Ukrainian Writers in Exile “Slovo” (“The Word”), the Union of Argentine Writers SADE (Sociedad Argentina de Escritores), National Writers' Union of Ukraine (since 1992).

In accordance with his own wish, uttered repeatedly in conversations and letters to acquaintances, his ashes were buried in his home village Kruty, the solemn event having taken place 22 November 2013.

Poetry 

Igor Kaczurowskyj is the author of the following books of verse: “Nad Svitlym Dzherelom” (“At The Luminous Fountain), Salzburg 1948; “V Dalekiy Havani” (“In The Far Harbor”), Buenos Aires 1956;  “Pisnya Pro Bilyi Parus” (“White Sail Song”), Munich 1971; “Svichada Vichnosty” (“Mirrors of Eternity”), Munich 1990; “Osinni Piznyotsvity” (“Autumn Crocuses”), Kyiv 2000, 2001). The last was published in one volume, along with the poem “Selo” (“The Village”;  1st edition: Neu-Ulm 1960;  4th edition with the title “Selo v Bezodni” (“The Village in an Abyss”; Kyiv 2006). The final collection of selected poems named “Liryka” was published in Lviv (2013).

As a poet Kaczurowskyj was a follower of the Kyiv neoclassicists, a literary disciple of Mykhailo Orest (along with Orest, he is supposed to be one of the representatives of the post-neoclassical movement, or younger neoclassicists). Similar to Mykola Zerov and the poets of his literary school, Kaczurowskyj was a master in “poetry of the second degree” (in his own terminology “transpositive poetry”) such a “poetry of culture” which is considered by Dmytro Nalyvayko as one of the major attributes of classicism as a type of artistic thought (section “Stara Evropa” (“Ancient Europe”) in the book “Svichada vichnosty”). At the same time Kaczurowskyj composed refined love poems (section “Pisnya pro bilyi parus” in the book of verse of the same title), and poetry of nature (section “Hrybna mistyka” (“Mushroom mysticism”) in “Svichada vichnosty”). In general, Kaczurowskyj's poetry is marked by a painful disharmony between spiritualized beauty embodied in primeval nature,  the masterworks of art of the past ages and the spiritual decay of modern civilization, between high human feelings and contrasts of social reality. His long poem “Selo” was the first great epic in Ukrainian literature depicting the tragedy of Ukrainian Holodomor (Famine-Genocide) of 1932–3.

The main characteristics of his poetical style, are a neoclassical clarity, achieved by open metaphors, a refined lexis, a select poetical language, free of every coarseness or vulgarism, the strict adherence to the accentual-syllabic (classic) verse meter, and the perfect dominion of canons ruling the poems' stanzas (mostly of Roman origin).

Kaczurowskyj's poetical parodies, epigrams, jests, and other humorous writings, used to be published, abroad and in Ukraine, under the pseudonym Khvedosiy Chichka.

As a writer for children, Kaczurowskyj is the author of the long poem "Pan Kotskyi" ("Mister Kotskyi"; the first edition, Kyiv 1992; the second  edition, Kyiv 2016, under the patronage of the German Embassy in Kyiv, with a German adaptation, in verse, by Wilhelm Steinbüchler), and the book "U svynyachomu tsarstvi" ("In The Wild Boars' Kingdom", Munich 1997).

Prose

His prose writings comprise the novel "Shlyakh nevidomoho" ("The Way of an Unknown"), Munich 1956, which later was translated into English by Yuriy Tkach ("Because Deserters Are Immortal", Doncaster, Australia 1979) and into German by Lidia Kriukow ("Der Weg eines Unbekannten: Geschichte eines ukrainischen Deserteurs", Frankfurt am Main 2018); the novel "Dim nad krucheyu" ("House on a Cliff"), Munich 1966; these books consist of episodes, relating the adventures of a young Ukrainian intellectual during the Second World War, between two demoniac forces, the Soviets, and Hitler's nationalists, some reviewers, such as Caroline Egerton of "The Age", Melbourne, and Petro Soroka, Ukraine, remarking their anti-existencialist motives; a shorter story "Zaliznyi kurkul'" ("The Iron Landowner"), Munich 1959, Poltava 2005; a series of short stories, among which: "Po toy bik bezodni" ("Beyond the Abyss"), published in English in: "Urania" (A Journal of Creative Writing and Literary Studies), Kanpur, India,  vol. I, #I, 1987;  "Krynytsya bez vahadla" ("A Pit Without A Pendulum"); "Ochi Atosa" ("The Eyes Of Athos [a dog]"); "Tsybulyane vesillya" ("The Onion-Wedding"), etc., all his prose writings being published, jointly, in one volume with the title "Shlyakh nevidomoho", Kyiv 2006 (442 pages). Kaczurowskyj's memoirs are published in his book "Kruty moho dytynstva" ("The Village Kruty of My Childhood"), Nizhyn 2007, and the complete posthumous collection of his memoirs "Spomyny i postati" ("Memoirs and Figures", Kyiv 2018).

Translations

Igor Kaczurowskyj's translations of poetry had primarily appeared as parts of his aforementioned books of verse. Also, separate books of translations were published, such as: Francesco Petrarca "Vybrane" ("Selected Poems)", Munich 1982; "Zolota haluzka" ("Golden Branch"), being a collection of Iberian and Ibero-American poetry, from Spanish, Portuguese, and Catalan languages, Buenos Aires–Munich 1991; "Okno v ukrainskuyu poeziyu" ("A Window To Ukrainian Poetry"), Ukrainian poems in Russian translations, Munich–Kharkiv–Nizhyn 1997; "Stezhka kriz' bezmir" ("A Path Through The Immens"), 100 German poems, 750–1950, Paris–Lviv–Zwickau 2000; "Pisnya pro Rolanda" ("Song of Roland"), from Old French, maintaining the original syllabic metre, Lviv 2008; "Choven bez rybalky" by Alejandro Casona, a theatrical piece, translated from Spanish ("Boat Without Fisherman"), Buenos Aires 2000; "Nobelivs'ka lektsiya z literatury" ("Nobel Literature Lesson") by Aleksandr Solzhenitsyn, Neu Ulm 1973. The compilatory volume of his translations, "Kruh ponadzemnyi" ("The Super-Terrestrial Circle"), Kyiv 2007 (526 pages) comprises approximately 670 poems and fragments of over 350 authors, translated from 23 old and modern languages, first of all from Spanish (fragments of "Cantar de mio Cid", works of José Asunción Silva, Rubén Darío, Amado Nervo, Juan Ramón Jiménez, Alfonsina Storni, Gabriela Mistral, Federico García Lorca, Jorge Luis Borges, etc.), from Italian (the early sonnet writers: Petrarch, Michelangelo, etc., Portuguese (Olavo Bilac, etc.), from German (the Minnesingers, Friedrich Hölderlin, Ludwig Uhland, Joseph von Eichendorff, Friedrich Rückert, Annette von Droste-Hülshoff, etc.),  from English (ballads, Alfred Tennyson, etc.), from French (José Maria de Heredia, Paul Verlaine, Arthur Rimbaud, etc.), Polish (Julian Tuwim, etc.), Russian (Fedor Tyutchev, Aleksey Tolstoy, Fedor Sologub, Ivan Bunin, Maksimilian Voloshin, Nikolay Gumilyov, Anna Akhmatova, Osip Mandel'shtam, Sergey Yesenin, Leonid Kiselyov, etc.), and also from Ukrainian into Russian (Maksym Ryls'kyi, Mykola Zerov, Yuriy Klen, Volodymyr Svidzyns'kyi, Yevhen Pluzhnyk, Mykhaylo Orest, Oleh Olzhych, Lina Kostenko, etc.). Igor Kaczurowskyj considered himself a follower of Mykola Zerov's translating school, that is the translation of each verse with a maximum approach to the original, not only as regards the contents, but the metrical, and stylistic particularities as well. Sometimes, he recurred to prose interlinear translations made by Lidia Kriukow, who is familiar with many European languages.

Scientific work

In literary theory, Kaczurowskyj's major aim was the development of the principles put forward by Boris Yarkho and Volodymyr Derzhavyn. He is the author of several textbooks of theory of literature, which was the main subject — along with History of Literature — of his lectures and scientific papers. They are:

 "Novela yak zhanr" ("The Short Story as a Genre"), Buenos Aires 1958;
 "Strofika" ("A Study of Stanzas"), Munich 1967;
 "Fonika" ("Phonic"), Munich 1984;
 "Narys komparatyvnoyi metryky" ("An Outline on Comparative Meters"). Munich 1985; second edition: Kyiv 1994;
 Stylistic: "Osnovy analizy movnykh form" ("Basic Analysis of Linguistic Patterns"), 1. "Leksyka" ("Lexis"), Munich–Nizhyn 1994, 2. "Figury i tropy" ("Figures and Tropes"), Munich–Kyiv 1995;
 "Generyka i Arkhitektonika" ("Literary Genres and Structure"): 1. "Literatura evropeys'koho serednyovichchya" ("European Literature of the Middle Ages"), a great work, with numerous translations into Ukrainian, analysis, etc., and an "Introduction" by Ivan Dzyuba, 380 pp., richly illustrated, Kyiv 2005, 2. "Zasady naukovoho literaturoznavstva" ("Principles of Literary Sciences") and "Zhanry novoho pys'menstva" ("New Literature Genres"), Kyiv 2008.

A synthesis of Kaczurowskyj's research work as a historian of Ukrainian literature, may be found in his book "Promenysti syl'vety" ("Shining Silhouettes") – lectures, papers, articles, essays, treatises, the main purpose of this work being to recall to mind the wrongly forgotten gifted authors of Ukrainian literature, especially those of the Second World War generation, and to relieve the minds of readers and researchers from the stereotype concepts regarding famous representatives of Ukrainian literature (Taras Shevchenko, Ivan Franko, Lesya Ukrayinka).

Selected broadcasting scripts on arts and literature from "Radio Liberty" were compiled in a volume: "150 vikon u svit" ("150 Windows to The World"), Kyiv 2008.

Due to the aesthetic concepts and canons featured in his textbooks and other writings, Kaczurowskyj may be considered an outstanding advocate of the theories of Ukrainian neoclassicism (along with Volodymyr Derzhavyn). He participates in the conviction that Beauty "is the greatest welfare, as a definite artistic synthesis of Goodness and Truth" (Derzhavyn), he advocates the autonomy of art, which, in his opinion, "is completely independent of social, political, climatic or any other circumstances", he defends the long duration of the traditions of artistic creativity, as a contrast and in opposition to the so-called post-modernism and its negation of past times artistic achievements.

Kaczurowskyj is the editor, together with Sviatoslav Hordynsky and Lidia Kriukow, as well as author of the "Forewords" ("Introductions") of the volumes: "Khrestomatiya ukrayins'koyi relihiynoyi literatury. Knyha persha – Poeziya" ("Chrestomathy of Ukrainian Religious Poetry"), Munich–London 1988, and the collection "Italiya v ukrayins'kiy poeziyi" ("Italy in Ukrainian Poetry"), Lviv 1999; he is also the editor of other editions, as well as the author of the introductions to the volumes: Mykhaylo Orest: "Pizni vruna" ("Late Blossoming"), Munich 1965; "Ukrayins'ka muza" ("Ukrainian Muse"), 2nd ed. by Oleksa Kovalenko, Buenos Aires 1973; and Yuriy Klen: "Tvory" ("Works"), part 1, New York 1992, etc.

Kaczurowskyj is the author of a popular essay on mycology: "Putivnyk dlya hrybariv" ("A Guidebook for Mushroom Hunters") conjointly with V. Ya. Baranov: "Vid Kyeva do Kachanivky cherez Nizhyn" ("From Kyiv to Kachanivka Through Nizhyn"), Kyiv 2011.

Awards

 1982 — Ivan Franko Fund (Chicago, United States) prize, awarded for the translation of Francesco Petrarca works.
 1994 — Maksym Ryls'kyi Prize, for his work as a translator.
 2002 — award of the SUCHASNIST magazine and the League of Ukrainian Patrons of Art, for his essay "Gothic Literature And Its Genres".
 2003 — Volodymyr Vynnychenko Prize, for his outstanding intellectual contribution to the development of Ukrainian culture.
 2006 — Volodymyr Svidzins'kyi Literary Award, for his activity as a poet and translator.
 2006 — National Taras Shevchenko Prize of Ukraine, for his book "Promenysti syl'vety (lectures, papers, articles, conferences, essays, treatises)", Munich 2002; 2nd ed. in the "Library of the Shevchenko Committee" series, Kyiv 2008.

References

Further reading
 Diccionario de escritores argentinos del siglo XX, Buenos Aires 2000, p. 70.
 Encyclopedia of Ukraine, Paris-New York 1959 (vol. II/3, p. 989), and 1995 (vol. II/11, p. 309).
 Segunda Antología de Poetas, Escritores y Ensayistas del Tercer Milenio,  Buenos Aires 1999, p. 75-78.
 Ukrayins’ka literaturna entsyklopediya: U 3 t. (Ukrainian Literary Encyclopedia: In 3 vol.), Kyiv 1990, t. 2: D–K (vol. 2: D–K), p. 436.
 Brosalina O.: Khudozhnyo-estrtychni zasady neoklasytsyzmu i tvorchist' Mykhayla Oresta ta Ihorya Kachurovs'koho (Artistic and Aesthetic Principles of Neoclassicism and the Work of Mykhaylo Orest and Ihor Kachurovs'kyi), Kyiv 2003.
 Bazylevs'kyi, V.: Shlyakh do Kastals'kykh Dzherel (Road to the Castalian Spring), LITERATURNA UKRAYINA, 03.09.1998.
 Shevchenkivs'ki laureaty 1962-2007. Entsuklopedychnyi dovidnyk (Winners of the Shevchenko-Award 1962-2007. An Encyclopedical Guidebook). Avtor-uporyadnyk Mykola Labins'kyi. Kyiv 2007.
 Cherevatenko L.: Ihor Kachurovs'kyi yak perekladach (I.K. as a Translator), SUCHASNIST' (The Present Time) #9, 2004.
 Strikha M.: Svitovyi sonet u perekladakh Ihorya Kachurovs'koho, (The World Sonnet in I.K.'s Translations), PRAPOR (The Banner) #9, 1990.
 Skurativs'kyi V.: Ihor Kachurovs'kyi -  istoryk kultury (I.K. as A Historian of Culture), SUCHASNIST' #9, 2004.
 Rep'yakh S.: A vseredyni — kamin' (Ihor Kachurovs'kyi),  (A Stone Inside {I.K.}), Chernihiv 2006,  156 pp.
 Derzhavyn V.: Ihor Kachurovs'kyi: mayster noveli (I.K., a Short Story Master), UKRAYINA I  SVIT (Ukraine and the World), Hannover, Book 17, 1957.
 Hordasevych H.: Syomyi z lebedynoho hrona (The Seventh of the Cluster of Swans), VITCHYZNA (Native Country)  #9-10,1995.

1918 births
2013 deaths
Ukrainian journalists
Ukrainian male poets
Ukrainian translators
Ukrainian writers
20th-century Ukrainian poets
20th-century translators
Soviet emigrants to Germany
People from Nizhyn